Miguel Juan de Plasencia was a Spanish friar of the Franciscan Order. He was among the first group of Franciscan missionaries who arrived in the Philippines on 2 July 1578.

He spent most of his missionary life in the Philippines, where he founded numerous towns in Luzon and authored several religious and linguistic books, most notably the Doctrina Cristiana (Christian Doctrine), the first book ever printed in the Philippines.

Early years
Juan de Plasencia was born in the early 16th century as Juan Portocarrero in Plasencia, in the region of Extremadura, Spain. He was one of the seven children of Pedro Portocarrero, a captain of a Spanish schooner.

Juan de Plasencia grew up during the period known as the Siglo de Oro, a Golden Age when arts and literature flourished in many parts of Spain, among them his native Extremadura.

It is not well known when or where he first entered the Order of the Franciscans. Some scholars point at the Convento de Villanueva de la Serena, in Plasencia, while others speculate that he might have traveled to Italy and joined a convent there, at a time when a large part of Italy was under Spanish rule. According to researchers, he took the habit as a young man at the Cloister of Saint Francis in Sorrento, Italy.

Life in the Philippines
He is believed to have arrived to the Philippines on 2 July 1578, after a stopover in Mexico. As soon as he arrived, he joined forces with another missionary, Fray Diego de Oropesa, and they both started preaching around Laguna de Bay and Tayabas, Quezon, in Quezon Province, where he founded several towns.

During the following years they are also credited with the foundation of a large number of towns in the provinces of Bulacan, Laguna and Rizal, such as Tayabas, Caliraya, Lucban, Majayjay, Nagcarlan, Lilio (Liliw), Pila, Santa Cruz, Lumban, Pangil, Siniloan, Morong, Antipolo, Taytay, and Meycauayan.

As a friar, Juan de Plasencia lived up to his pledge, leading a lifestyle devoid of any luxury and in constant contact with the people he was trying to convert to Christianity. He was also known to be a defender of the native population, looking after the poor, ill, or neglected, and standing up for their rights on numerous occasions.

He was also very keen on creating primary schools, and requested official sanction for the creation of educational centers where "Filipinos could not only learn Christian doctrine, but also reading and writing, and some arts and crafts, so they would become after, not only good Christians but also useful citizens", an initiative that was approved by Domingo de Salazar, the first Bishop of the See of Manila (1512–1594).

Written works
Juan de Plasencia wrote a number of books designed primarily to promote the understanding of both the Spanish language among the natives, and the local languages among the missionaries, to facilitate the task of spreading Christianity. He acknowledged at an early stage the need of mastering the language of the natives in order to facilitate evangelization, and in a letter to the King of Spain, dated 18 June 1585, he mentioned some of his works to that effect:

He is the author of what is believed to be the first book printed in the Philippines, the Doctrina Cristiana, that was not only printed in Spanish, but also in Tagalog, in both Latin script and the commonly used Baybayin script of the natives of the time, and it even had a version in Chinese.

Other works attributed to him are the "Relacion de las Costumbres de Los Tagalos" (1589), that not only helped understand and preserve many of the traditional ways of the local population, but also provided the first form of Civil Code, used by local governors to administer justice.

A mystical work which he entitled "La Santina", was an Opus number on prayer and contemplation entirely done in the Tagalog language so the natives who did not know Spanish could also engage in the spiritual exercises of their teachers.

Death
Juan de Plasencia died in Liliw, Laguna in 1590.

References

External links
Life and Works of Fray Juan de Plasencia

16th-century births
Roman Catholic missionaries in the Philippines
Spanish expatriates in the Philippines
Spanish Servants of God
16th-century venerated Christians
Authors of Spanish ethnographic accounts of the Philippines in the 16th century
Spanish Franciscans
Spanish Roman Catholic missionaries
1520s births
1590 deaths
Year of birth unknown
Franciscan missionaries